Recollections of Pavlovsk is a 1984 Soviet short documentary film directed by Irina Kalinina. At the 57th Academy Awards it was nominated for Best Documentary Short.

References

External links

1984 films
1984 short films
1984 documentary films
Soviet short documentary films
1980s Russian-language films
1980s short documentary films